The Hussite Overture, Op. 67, B. 132, was written by Antonín Dvořák in 1883 for the gala opening of the Prague National Theater. The composition was originally intended as a part of a dramatic trilogy on the Bohemian religious leader Jan Hus.

As with the third piano trio, the Scherzo capriccioso, the Ballade in D minor, and the seventh symphony, composed in the same period, the work is written in a more dramatic, dark and aggressive style that supersedes the carefree folk style of Dvořák's "Slavonic period".

The overture is scored for piccolo, 2 flutes, 2 oboes, cor anglais, 2 clarinets, 2 bassoons, 4 horns, 2 trumpets, 3 trombones, tuba, timpani, percussion (bass drum, cymbals, triangle), harp, and strings.

References

External links 
 

Compositions by Antonín Dvořák
Jan Hus
Concert overtures